Sigma Andromedae, Latinized from σ Andromedae, is the Bayer designation for a single star in the northern constellation of Andromeda. It has an apparent visual magnitude of +4.5, which is bright enough to be seen with the naked eye from most locations. The magnitude of the star is diminished by 0.08 from extinction caused by intervening gas and dust. It is drifting closer to the Sun with a radial velocity of –8 km/s.

This star has a stellar classification of A2 V, which matches the spectrum of an A-type main sequence star. It is about 450 million years old and is spinning rapidly with a projected rotational velocity of 123 km/s. The star has 2.12 times the mass of the Sun and 2.13 times the Sun's girth. It is radiating 21 times the luminosity of the Sun from its photosphere at an effective temperature of 8,929 K, giving it the white-hued glow of an A-type star.

In the past, radial velocity variations have been reported, but this remains unconfirmed. The star does not show any significant photometric variations and is used as an ubvy standard star. A debris disk of warm dust around this star has been detected by Spitzer Space Telescope.

Sigma Andromedae is a candidate for membership in the stream of stars associated with the Ursa Major Moving Group. This is a set of stars that share a common motion through space, which suggests they originated together.

Naming

References

A-type main-sequence stars
Ursa Major Moving Group

Andromedae, Sigma
Andromeda (constellation)
Durchmusterung objects
Andromedae, 25
001404
001473
0068